Everyday Food (from the test kitchens of Martha Stewart Living) was a digest size cooking magazine and PBS public television program published and produced by Martha Stewart Living Omnimedia (MSLO). Both feature quick and easy recipes targeted at supermarket shoppers and the everyday cook.

History and profile
Everyday Food was established in 2003. It stopped stand-alone subscriptions and became a bi-monthly supplement packaged with Martha Stewart Living in 2013, while also continuing to provide digital content online and through the tablet app "Martha's Everday Food".

In August 2004, the Everyday Food television show on PBS was announced.  It aired for six seasons from Jan 2005 through April 2010. A companion series, Everyday Baking from Everyday Food, with John Barricelli as the principal chef, premiered in January 2008 and ran for only one season of 13 episodes.

See also
 Martha Stewart
 Martha Stewart Living
 Martha Stewart Living Omnimedia
 WETA-TV

References

External links
 Magazine Official Site
 Television Program Official Site
 Martha Stewart Official Site
 Everyday Food Blog

Irregularly published magazines published in the United States
Defunct magazines published in the United States
Food and drink magazines
Magazines established in 2003
Magazines disestablished in 2013
Martha Stewart Living Omnimedia
Online magazines with defunct print editions